Bundi is a district in the Hadoti region of Rajasthan state in northwest India and capital of the former princely state of Rajputana agency. District of Bundi is named after the former princely state.

Demographics
According to the 2011 Indian census, Bundi had a population of 103,286. Males constituted 52% of the population, while females made up 48%. Bundi had an average literacy rate of 82%, higher than the national average of 73%, with male literacy of 89.77% and female literacy of 73.77%. 12% of the population was under 6 years of age.

Location & Geographical Area 

Bundi city is situated in the southeast of Rajasthan between the north and east longitude. the length of the district from east to west is about 110 km and it is about 104km from north to south. Bundi is located in the north of tonk district and west of Bhilwara and southwest of Chittorgarh District. The river Chambal forms the eastern boundaries, separating Bundi and Kota territories. The southern part of Bundi forms a wedge between Bhilwara and Kota and also touches the Chittorgarh district. The total geographical area of the district is 581938 hectares.

History

Stone Age tools dating from 5,000 to 200,000 years were found in Bundi and Bhilwara districts of the state.

Ancient era 
The area around Bundi was apparently inhabited by various native tribes, the most notable of which were the Parihar Meenas. Bundi and the eponymous princely state are said to be named after Bunda Meena, a former Meena king. Bundi was previously known as "Bunda-Ka-Nal," with Nal meaning "narrow ways." Rao Deva Hara later ruled the region, taking over Bundi from Jaita Meena in A.D. 1342 by fraud and renaming the surrounding area as Haravati or Haroti.

Hammir provided Devi Singh, a Hara (Chauhan) Sardar of his who lived in Bhainsror (Mewar), with enough force to attack the Mina/Meena Chief of Bundi The Maharaja Bunda Meena and wrest control of that kingdom from the Minas/Meena . Bundi was conquered by Devi Singh in 1341 a.d., and its rulers remained primarily confined of the Maharajas until Emperor Akbar severed their ties with Mewar.

Bundi comes in contact with the Mughal emperor in 1544-85 C.E when Raja Rao Surjan is ruling over there. Bundi had been a vassal state of Mewar state before raja Rao surrender the Ranthambore (March 1569 AD) to the Mughal emperor Akbar. Later Bundi becomes the tributary state of the Mughal. Raja Rao commenced a new era in the history of business. Akbar made him the Governor of Benaras.Akbar gave him Few Districts near Bundi and Benaras .He handed over the administration of Bundi to his eldest son Duda.Rao Surjan died in 1585 C.E.at Banaras.

With the help of Akbar's, his second son Rao Bhoj (1585-1607) succeeded him. He participate with Akbar in his Gujarat Campaign and In appreciation of its Outstanding service Akbar offered the construction of "Bhoj –Burj".

After Rao Bhoj died in 1607, Rao Ratan become the new king. He had been honored with the title of "Surbuland Rai" and "Ram Raj" by Jahangir. In 1624 C.E Hara state was divided Into 2 parts –Bundi and Kota. Rao Ratan found a new township, Ratanapur. He is remembered in the history of Bundi for his bravery, charity, and love for justice.

Rao Chattarsal succeeded Rao Ratan in 1631C.E.He was the eldest son of Gopinath and the Grand son of Rao Ratan. He fought many battles for Shahjahan. Chattarshal fought for Dara Shikoh at the time of the war of succession. He died in 1658 C.E in the Battle Field of Samugarh near Dholapur along with his youngest son Bharat Singh. He remained an Immortal name in the history of the state for his courage and devotion. He built the temple of Keshava Rao at Patan and the Chattra –Mahal at Bundi.

Anirudha Singh was born in 1666 C.E.H e was only 15 years old when he ascended the throne of Bundi. Anirudh sigh along with Amber raja (Raja Bishan Singh)posted in the Northwest under Prince Muazzam and he died there in 1702 C.E

Anirudh Singh was succeeded by his eldest son Budha Singh in C.E 1702. Budha Singh fought from the side of Prince Muazzam on the Battlefield of Jaipur. And After his victory, The title of Rao Raja is transferred to him by Prince Muazzam. and also gave him the state of Kotah as a reward. Later on, Prince Muazzam made Bhim Singh the new ruler of Kota. Jai Singh 2 who is ruling over Jaipur at that time his Forces made a surprise attack on Bundi and dethroned Budha Singh as a domestic feud and gained and lost Bundi at least 4 times. For at least 14 years (1730-44 C.E) Bundi remained dependent on Sawai Jai Singh. Budha Singh died as a frustrated man in C.E. 1739.

Ummed Singh, son of Buddha Singh was one of the bravest of Haras. He fought for his state against Kota, Jaipur, and Maratha but lost the battle. In 1748 C.E Raja Ishwari Singh recognized him as a ruler of Bundi.Ummed sigh handover all his power in the favor of his Son and become a monk . Ummed Singh was a great patron of arts and he built the famous "Chitrasala or Art Gallery "in Bundi...He died in C.E.1804 and was succeeded by his son Arjit Singh ( for 1771-73 C.E ) and later his grandson Bishan Singh Rule over the Bundi ( 1773-1821 C.E).

In 1818C.E Bundi comes under the British thralldom and Bishan Singh becomes a loyal friend of the British. He rendered his service to the British in the war against Pindaris.He was a mighty hunter and it is said that he killed about one hundred lions ,tigers, and innumerable Boars.

Ram Singh succeeded Bundi from Bishan Singh.He was known as a great pandit and a religious man of strict Hindu orthodox. In 1950 ,all the small states of Rajasthan merged into the present state and this made Bundi a present state of Rajasthan.

Historical places

Taragarh Fort 
The white fort standing on the wooden hills is the most beautiful fort in Rajasthan. The fort was raised in 1345 AD and has a colossal gateway. Inside the fort one can see a colossal battlement called Burj and a large reservoir carved out of solid rock.

Bundi Palace
The marvellous structure adjoining Taragarh Fort atop the hills exhibits the extraordinary craftsmanship of the place. Chittrashala is part of Bundi palace and consists of the pavilion exhibiting miniature colourful murals depicting the story of Krishna.

Chattar Mahal
The palace can be reached by a steep path. The palace houses the Naubat khana, a Hazari pole with an ancient water clock, and the Diwan-i-Am (Red Fort).

Ratan Daulat
This remarkable structure consists of nine horses and a hatia pole was constructed by Rao Raja Ratan Singh.

Eighty-four pillared cenotaph
A magnificent memorial with 84 pillars in the cenotaphs along with the shiva lingam was erected by Rao Anirudh.

Nawal Sagar Lake
This artificial lake features at its centre a half-submerged temple dedicated to Varuna, the Aryan god of Air.

Culture of Bundi 
Bundi was formerly known as the "Republic of Meenas" which was conquered by Dev Singh Hara, who established it as an independent state. There are Parihar Meenas who lived in the other villages of Bundi. Agriculture was the main occupation of Bundi at that time. Besides Meenas, Gujjars, Brahmins, Vaishyas, Ahirs, and Dhakars, Malisand Nais also lived in the Bundi state.

Rajasthan is famous for its arts and craft, so just like other states of Rajasthan Bundi is also rich in religious thoughts, literature,art and folk lore. Bundi's rulers are devoted to Vishnu and worship the Hindu pantheon. The people of Bundi are much devoted to goddesses symbolising female energy as a source of creation.

Festivals like Gangaur, Diwali, Holi, Teej, Deshera, Annakot and Rakshabandhan are celebrated in Bundi. The festival of Gangaur and Teej are considered the important and significant festivals of Bundi. Other religious festivals like Mahavir Jayanti for Jains and Moharram for Muslims are also popular in Bundi.

The main language group of the region is Rajasthani, with Harauti and Mewari amongst the more common languages.

Bundi state is also rich in the field of architecture and art. Chattra–Mahal and Chitra–Sala are amongst the most famous buildings of Bundi. Their style and structure are a mixture of Rajasthani and Mughal architecture. Bundi Palace is known for its distinctive Bundi-style murals. The outer walls of houses is also painted with beautiful pictures of elephants, lions, the sun, the moon, and Ganesh.

References

Further reading

External links

 Official website of Bundi collectorate

 
Cities and towns in Bundi district
Tourist attractions in Bundi district